Tron is a coin-operated arcade video game manufactured and distributed by Bally Midway in 1982. The game consists of four subgames inspired by the events of the Walt Disney Productions motion picture Tron released earlier in the summer. The lead programmer was Bill Adams. The music programmer was Earl Vickers.

Tron was followed by a 1983 sequel, Discs of Tron, which was not as successful. A number of other licensed Tron games were released for home systems, but these were based directly on elements of the movie and not the arcade game.

Gameplay 
Tron consists of four sub-games based on events and characters in the movie. In general, the player controls Tron, either in human form or piloting a vehicle, using an eight-way joystick for movement, a trigger button on the stick to fire (or slow down the player's light cycle), and a rotary dial for aiming. The goal of the game is to score points and advance through the game's twelve levels by completing each of the sub-games. Most of the 12 levels are named after programming languages: RPG, COBOL, BASIC, FORTRAN, SNOBOL, PL1, PASCAL, ALGOL, ASSEMBLY, OS, JCL, USER. The game supports two players alternating.

At the start of each level, the player is taken to a "Game Grid" selection screen divided into four quadrants. The player must choose a quadrant, each of which corresponds to a different sub-game. The sub-game in each quadrant is not known to the player until it is selected. If the player fails the game and loses a life, they are taken back to this selection screen and an icon representing that game is now visible. Failure to choose a quadrant before an on-screen timer runs out results in a sub-game being chosen at random. Once the player completes a particular sub-game, it is taken out of play until the start of the next level.

The sub-games are as follows:

I/O Tower
The player must guide Tron to the flashing circle of an Input/Output Tower within a set time limit while avoiding or destroying Grid Bugs. This game is based on the I/O Tower scene in the film, while adding the Grid Bugs as enemies (which were only briefly mentioned in the film). A bit occasionally appears on the screen and can be picked up for bonus points.

MCP Cone
The player must break through a rotating shield wall protecting the MCP cone and enter the cone without touching any of the shield blocks. This game is based on Tron's final battle with the MCP in the film, but changes the nature of the MCP's shield. Bonus points are awarded for destroying every block in the shield.

Light Cycles
In a player-vs-AI variant of the Snake game concept, the player guides Tron's blue Light Cycle in an arena against one or more yellow opponents. The objective is to force the enemy cycles to crash into walls, jet trails, or each other, while simultaneously avoiding them. When an enemy cycle crashes, both it and its trail disappear. This game is based on the Light Cycle Arena sequence in the film, though the colors of the friendly and enemy characters are reversed. This is the only sub-game in Tron to not use the rotary dial.

Battle Tanks
The player must guide Tron's red battle tank through a maze and destroy all of the opposing blue enemy tanks by shooting each of them three times. The tank can warp to a random location in the maze by moving into a diamond in the center, and its shots bounce off walls or obstructions until reaching their maximum travel distance. In higher difficulty levels, the enemy tanks are replaced by red Recognizers that are much faster and attempt to collide with the player instead of shooting at him/her. This game is not based on any particular scene, but is rather based on Tank Program elements, including Clu's failed intrusion into the ENCOM mainframe and the "Space Paranoids" game featured at the beginning of the film.

Development
Bally Midway had two different design teams submit pitches for the game. One team planned a first-person vector graphics game, while the second team suggested a collection of five minigames using existing Bally Midway technology; the second proposal was used because it had a better chance of being completed by the deadline. One of the five minigames was ultimately left out due to the time constraints.

Reception 
Tron was awarded "Coin-Operated Game of the Year" by Electronic Games magazine.

The New York Times reported that 800 arcade cabinets were sold in 1982. By January 1983, it was number-four on the RePlay arcade charts. The book The naked computer reported that Tron made $45,000,000 by 1983. In USgamer's estimation 10,000 cabinets were sold and the game made more than $30,000,000 of revenue by 1983. In 1995, Flux magazine ranked the arcade version 49th on their Top 100 Video Games.  They praised the soundtrack and said at the time: "Even many of today's coin-ops can't compete with the mighty Tron."

Records 
The world record high score for Tron was set in July 2011 by David Cruz of Brandon, Florida. Cruz scored 14,007,645 points based on Twin Galaxies rules and settings for the game.

Legacy 
Discs of Tron (1983) is an arcade game which was originally intended as a fifth segment of Tron but was left out because programming was not finished in time. In it, the player engages in disc throwing combat, similar to the film sequence. Discs of Tron was not widely released.

Two clones of the game, ElecTron (1984) and Kron (1983), were released for the TRS-80 Color Computer.

The light cycles segment of Tron has led to Snake games sometimes being called "Light Cycles" games, despite the concept dating from 1976. Some post-Tron snake games use themes or terminology from the film.

The 2004 Game Boy Advance game Tron 2.0: Killer App contains ports of the original Tron and Discs of Tron arcade games.

Tron was released for Xbox Live Arcade in January 2008, ported by Digital Eclipse and branded by Disney Interactive.

A miniature Tron arcade cabinet showing a looping video of the game's attract screens is featured as a toy in the Tron Legacy pinball machine, released in 2011 by Stern Pinball.

In October 2021, Arcade1Up released a recreated cabinet of the original Tron arcade game.

References

External links 

 
 Tron homage site

Tron video games
1982 video games
Action video games
Arcade video games
Midway video games
Minigame compilations
Snake video games
Tank simulation video games
Video games developed in the United States
Xbox 360 Live Arcade games
Multiplayer and single-player video games